French India Company may refer to:

 French East India Company
 French West India Company